Mastoora Bibi is a Pakistani politician who is the member of the Provincial Assembly of Balochistan.

Political career
Bibi was elected to the Provincial Assembly of Balochistan as a candidate of Balochistan National Party (Awami) (BNP (Awami)) on a reserved seat for women in consequence of 2018 Pakistani general election. She assumed the membership of the assembly on 13 August 2018.

References

Living people
Balochistan National Party (Awami) politicians
Politicians from Balochistan, Pakistan
Year of birth missing (living people)